The men's long jump event at the 1995 Pan American Games was held at the Estadio Atletico "Justo Roman" on 18 and 19 March.

Medalists

Results

Qualification

Final

References

Athletics at the 1995 Pan American Games
1995